Kids for Peace is a global, nonprofit, 501(c)(3) youth organization.  Kids for Peace has over 100 chapters, spanning six continents.

Peace Packs
One of the principal activities of Kids for Peace chapters is sending "Peace Packs" to other children around the world.  Peace Packs are hand-painted knapsacks filled with school supplies, toiletries, a toy, and a personal note of friendship.   Prior to making Peace Packs, Kids for Peace members learn about the culture of the recipients, often from a guest speaker who has lived there.

Peace Hero Awards
Each year, Kids for Peace chooses a Peace Hero, a well-recognized role model chosen by the children of Kids for Peace.  Peace Heroes are selected based on their living by the words of the Peace Pledge, their contribution to making the world a better place and the way they inspire youth to be their best selves.  Past Peace Hero award recipients are Tony Hawk (2009), Rob Machado (2008) and Frances Fisher (2007).  Nominees for the 2010 Peace Hero award are Bindi Irwin, Jane Goodall, Dwayne Johnson and Jack Johnson.

The Great Kindness Challenge

In 2008 Kids for Peace launched an annual event called The Great Kindness Challenge.  It takes place on the second Saturday in August and is open to youth of all ages.  The Great Kindness Challenge is one day where kids around the world dedicate themselves to performing as many acts of kindness as possible, using a checklist of 50 suggestions.  These acts of kindness range from holding the door open for someone to cleaning up a local park to making sack lunches for homeless people.  In 2009, The Great Kindness Challenge involved at least 35 countries, in six continents.  The next one will be held on August 14, 2010.

Books
Kids for Peace published its first book, Peace Through Our Eyes: A Book of Hope and Inspiration, in 2008.  It features words and drawings by kids responding to the question “What does peace mean to you?”  Fulfilling its intention to make this a biannual project, Kids for Peace is now producing its second book, Wish Big: Children’s Wishes for the World.  This book, to be published by the summer of 2010, will feature children’s drawings answering the question, “What is my wish for the world?”

History
Kids for Peace was founded in 2006 in Carlsbad, California by Danielle Gram, then a high school student, and Jill McManigal, mother of Hana and Bodhi and a children’s playwright and director.

Ms. Gram’s work in creating Kids for Peace contributed to her selection as a winner of the Nestlé Very Best in Youth Award in 2007.  Danielle Gram recently graduated from Harvard University and is currently working in Pader, Uganda, teaching life skills to child victims of the Lord's Resistance Army. Ms. Gram's service work and travels can be followed on her blog.

Ms. McManigal, a former elementary school teacher, is now the Executive Director of Kids for Peace.  In November 2009, Ms. McManigal received a Bank of America Local Hero award, recognizing her work through Kids for Peace.

From the initial gathering of neighborhood children in Ms. McManigal’s home, the organization has grown to over 100 chapters worldwide, spanning all six inhabited continents.  Countries as diverse as Australia, Sierra Leone, Bangladesh, the Dominican Republic, Greece and Mongolia are now home to Kids for Peace chapters.

References

Youth organizations based in California
Carlsbad, California